Spokane Valley High School (SVHS or SVH) in Spokane Valley, Washington, USA, is part of the West Valley School District.

In popular culture
The school has been featured on PBS once in 2010  and in 2013 on the Frontline episode "Education Under Arrest".
Spokane Valley High School opened its doors in 1982.

References

Public high schools in Washington (state)